Alex Tyson Carey (born 27 August 1991) is an Australian international cricketer. Formerly an Australian rules footballer, he is currently a wicket-keeper who plays for the Australian national team in test match and one day formats. In domestic cricket, he plays for South Australia and Adelaide Strikers. He was the captain of the Greater Western Sydney Giants in 2010, but when they joined the Australian Football League in 2012, he was left out of the squad and returned to his home state of South Australia, where he began to play domestic cricket.

Carey initially made his debut as a specialist top-order batsman in 2013, but was unsuccessful and dropped. He moved down the batting order and became a wicket-keeper.

Football career

As a teenager, Carey played both Australian rules football and cricket, and as he got older, he started to play football at a higher level, playing for Glenelg in the South Australian National Football League (SANFL) reserves competition alongside adults by the time he was 15. In 2008, Carey was included in South Australia's squad for the 2008 AFL Under 18 Championships, but he did not play any game. He was also in the AIS/AFL Academy intake for 2008. He continued to advance in 2009 and played for South Australia in the 2009 AFL Under 18 Championships in addition to winning the SANFL reserves premiership with Glenelg.

Carey turned down a rookie contract offer from the South Australian Cricket Association and moved to Sydney in 2010 to join the Australian Football League's (AFL) new expansion club, the Greater Western Sydney Giants, who were playing in the TAC Cup for the season to prepare for their entry into the AFL in 2012. Carey captained the side, who made it to the finals and, despite missing the final four rounds due to injury, won the team's best and fairest award. He played for them again in 2011 in the North East Australian Football League, but he wasn't given a place in their inaugural AFL squad for the 2012 season and returned to Adelaide.

Cricket career

Domestic and T20 career
When Carey returned to Adelaide, he initially intended to return to the Glenelg Football Club, but he decided to switch sports and went back into grade cricket with the Glenelg Cricket Club for the 2012–13 season. He started out as a specialist batsman and averaged close to 50 for Glenelg in all formats. His form warranted his first call-up to represent South Australia. He made his List A cricket debut in a Ryobi Cup match against New South Wales and was also brought into the Sheffield Shield side, making his first-class debut. He played three Shield matches and averaged only 10.1 in six batting innings as he was dropped from the side.

Carey was given a rookie contract with South Australia for the 2013–14 season, though he didn't play a game for the state team during the season. After his failures as a top-order batsman, he became a wicket-keeper and moved down the batting order. This resulted in him being able to play several matches for South Australia in the Futures League. His breakout season came in 2015–16, when he scored 822 runs at an average of 90.22 in 10 matches for Glenelg, including big scores of 195 against Adelaide and 151 against West Torrens. In the Futures League, he averaged 44.13 in his five matches, so he was called up to play for South Australia again in the final four rounds of the 2015–16 Sheffield Shield season, replacing experienced wicket-keeper Tim Ludeman, including an appearance in the Sheffield Shield final.

For the 2016–17 season, Carey was given his first senior contract with South Australia. This season was by far his most successful yet, as he became just the fourth player to record 500 runs with the bat and 50 dismissals as a wicket-keeper in a single Sheffield Shield season after Chris Hartley, Matthew Wade and Adam Gilchrist. During the Sheffield Shield final, he took his 59th dismissal of the tournament, a record for wicket-keeper in a single Sheffield Shield season. His improvement resulted in his inclusion in Australia's National Performance Squad in the 2017 off-season, and he was also named as the sole wicket-keeper in the Australia A squad which was meant to tour South Africa for the 2017 South Africa A Team Tri-Series. He was chosen ahead of former Test keepers Peter Nevill and Tim Paine, indicating he was the next in line to replace Matthew Wade in the Australian Test team if Wade became injured.

Carey started the 2017–18 season playing in the JLT Cup for South Australia, coming close to a maiden century when he scored 92 against Victoria in the elimination final as part of South Australia's fourth-biggest one-day partnership of all time, putting on 212 runs with Jake Weatherald. As a result of his selection for Australia A and one-day form, Carey went into the 2017–18 Sheffield Shield season as one of the main contenders to play for Australia in the 2017–18 Ashes series. Though he had only played 18 first-class matches prior to the start of the season, Carey was considered the best young wicket-keeper in Australia. He had an opportunity to score runs and impress selectors in the first two matches, but he failed to score above fifty before the squad was named, coming close when he scored 46 not out before being stranded without any partners left against Western Australia. He was overlooked for the team, with Tim Paine being chosen instead. Despite his failure to make it into the national team, Carey scored his maiden first-class century when he made 139 for South Australia against Queensland.

In May 2019, Carey was signed by Sussex County Cricket Club to play in the 2019 t20 Blast tournament in England. In the 2020 IPL auction, he was bought by the Delhi Capitals ahead of the 2020 Indian Premier League.

International career
Carey's 2017–18 Big Bash League season form saw him make his One Day International (ODI) debut for Australia, replacing an ill Tim Paine on 19 January 2018. Later the same month, he was named in Australia's Twenty20 International (T20I) squad for the 2017–18 Trans-Tasman Tri-Series, which started in February 2018. He made his T20I debut for Australia against New Zealand on 3 February 2018.

In April 2018, Carey was awarded a national contract by Cricket Australia for the 2018–19 season. On 8 May 2018, he was named vice-captain of the Australia T20 team. In April 2019, he was named in Australia's squad for the 2019 Cricket World Cup. He scored 375 runs from 10 matches and was Australia's 4th highest run scorer during the World Cup, behind Steve Smith, Aaron Finch and David Warner. He also set the record for most catches by a wicket-keeper in a single edition of the World Cup, with 18 catches. He also stumped two batsmen to take his tally to an overall 20 dismissals. Following the World Cup, the International Cricket Council (ICC) named Carey as the rising star of the squad. He was named as wicket-keeper in the 'Team of the Tournament' for the 2019 World Cup by the ICC.

On 16 July 2020, Carey was named in a 26-man preliminary squad of players to begin training ahead of a possible tour to England following the COVID-19 pandemic. On 14 August 2020, Cricket Australia confirmed that the fixtures would be taking place, with Carey included in the touring party.

Carey played in the first two T20I matches as wicket-keeper, but was dropped for the third in favour of Matthew Wade. Wade remained Australia's T20I wicket-keeper through the rest of 2020 and 2021, although Carey played some T20I matches as a batsman.

Carey remained as Australia's ODI wicket-keeper, and played all three ODIs of the 2020 England tour. In the third ODI of the tour, on 16 September 2020, Carey scored his maiden ODI century, with 106 off 114 deliveries. He shared a partnership of 212 runs with Glenn Maxwell for the sixth wicket and helped Australia win the match by 3 wickets.

In July 2021, Carey was named as Australia's captain for Australia's 1st ODI against West Indies in the absence of Aaron Finch who was suffering from a knee injury at the time. It was the first time Carey was named as Australia's ODI captain after already being vice captain of the side. Australia won the 1st ODI under his captaincy by 133 runs and Carey also completed 1000 ODI runs and 50 ODI catches in the match.

Carey made his Test debut on 8 December 2021, in the first Test of the 2021–22 Ashes series. He was chosen as the wicket-keeper for the first two Tests of the series, after Tim Paine stepped down from the Test team. Carey's baggy green cap was presented to him by Adam Gilchrist. Carey equalled the most catches by a wicket-keeper on Test debut, with eight catches. Carey was selected for Australia's 2022 tour of Pakistan and played in 3 tests and 3 ODIs. In the first innings of the first test, Carey scored 19 runs off of 43 balls. Australia did not bat a second time, and the match was drawn. In the first innings of the second test, Carey scored 93 off of 159 balls, before being bowled by Pakistani captain, Babar Azam. Carey did not bat during the second innings and the match was drawn. This was his highest score and was one run higher than previous Australian captain and wicketkeeper, Tim Paine, who had a high score of 92. In the first innings of the third and final test, Carey scored 67 runs off of 105 balls and helped Australia reach a total of 391 runs. Carey did not bat in the second innings and Australia won the match by 115 runs and won the 3 match series 1–0. Carey finished the test series with 179 runs from 3 innings, with a high score of 93 and an average of 59.66, which was the second highest on the Australian side. 

In December 2022, Carey scored his maiden Test century during the Boxing Day Test against South Africa, becoming only the second wicketkeeper (after Rod Marsh) to score a century at the MCG, and the first Australian wicketkeeper to score a Test century since Brad Haddin in 2013.

References

External links
 

Living people
1991 births
Australian cricketers
People from Loxton, South Australia
Adelaide Strikers cricketers
South Australia cricketers
Sussex cricketers
Australia One Day International cricketers
Australia Twenty20 International cricketers
Cricketers at the 2019 Cricket World Cup
Delhi Capitals cricketers
Australian cricket captains
Australia Test cricketers
Wicket-keepers